Union Township is one of fourteen townships in Madison County, Indiana, United States. As of the 2010 census, its population was 8,898 and it contained 4,004 housing units.

History
Union Township was organized in 1830. It was likely named in commemoration of the federal union of the United States.

Geography

Cities, towns, villages
 Anderson (east edge)
 Chesterfield (vast majority)

Cemeteries
The township contains these three cemeteries: Bronnenberg, Clem and Keesling.

Major highways
  Interstate 69
  State Road 32

Airports and landing strips
 Anderson Municipal Airport

Education
 Anderson Community School Corporation

Union Township residents may obtain a free library card from the Anderson Public Library in Anderson.

Political districts
 Indiana's 6th congressional district
 State House District 35
 State House District 37
 State Senate District 25

References
 
 United States Census Bureau 2008 TIGER/Line Shapefiles
 IndianaMap

External links
 Indiana Township Association
 United Township Association of Indiana
 City-Data.com page for Union Township
 Union Township History
 Chesterfield-Union Township Fire Department

Townships in Madison County, Indiana
Townships in Indiana